Baron Aschwin of Sierstorpff-Cramm (29 March 184614 October 1909) was the maternal grandfather of Prince Bernhard of Lippe-Biesterfeld, Prince consort of Queen Juliana of the Netherlands.

Early life
Aschwin of Cramm was born at the village of Lohndorf in the Kingdom of Bavaria, German Empire, as the third child and first son of Adolf of Cramm (1812–1879), and his wife, Hedwig of Cramm (1819–1891).

Marriage
Aschwin married on 24 September 1872 at Bad Driburg to Baroness Hedwig of Sierstorpff-Driburg (1848–1900), member of a Prussian noble family. She was daughter of Count Ernst of Sierstorpff-Driburg (1813-1855) and his wife, Baroness Karoline of Vincke (1822-1870).

They had four daughters:
Hedwig (10 January 1874 – 21 January 1907), married in 1896 to Count Wilhelm of Oeynhausen-Sierstorpff, had issue.
Wanda (9 August 1879 – 1960), married in 1900 to Max von Krieger, had issue.
Erika (1880–1915), married to Caspar von der Marwitz, had issue.
Armgard (18 December 1883 – 27 April 1971), married in 1905 to Count Bodo of Oeynhausen, divorced in 1908, no issue; Married secondly in 1909 to Prince Bernhard of Lippe-Biesterfeld, had issue.

In 1881, Aschwin added the last name of his wife (Sierstorpff) to his own, since his father-in-law was the last male surviving heir of the Sierstorpff family name and estate.

Career
Aschwin was hereditary chamberlain of the Duke of Brunswick. Later he served as Master of the Horse where he met with the Sultan of the Ottoman Empire. He settled on his estate of Reckenwalde, Province of Brandenburg (now Wojnowo, Poland).

Ancestry

Notes and sources
Genealogisches Handbuch des Adels, Fürstliche Häuser, Reference: 1964 548

1846 births
1909 deaths
People from Bamberg